Mount Ommaney Shopping Centre bus station is a bus station in Queensland. It serves the Brisbane suburb of Mount Ommaney. Mount Ommaney Shopping Centre is situated next to the Mount Ommaney Shopping Centre for which the station takes its name and a Brisbane City Council library.

Services by platform
Mount Ommaney Shopping Centre has one platform. Some routes terminate at Mount Ommaney Shopping Centre. A second platform exists to stable buses that are waiting to begin service, though it is not primarily for passenger use.

References

Bus stations in Brisbane